The Australasian Performing Right Association Awards of 1994 (generally known as APRA Awards) are a series of awards held in 1994. The APRA Music Awards were presented by Australasian Performing Right Association (APRA) and the Australasian Mechanical Copyright Owners Society (AMCOS).

Awards 

Winners are shown in bold with known nominees shown in plain.

See also 

 Music of Australia

References

External links 

 APRA official website

1994 in Australian music
1994 music awards
APRA Awards